The World Eventing Championships, or the eventing competition in the World Equestrian Games (WEG), began in 1966. It includes both a team and individual competition for the best horses and riders in the sport of eventing. The World Championship is held every four years, and is held at the CCI**** level, the highest level of eventing competition.

Past winners

Individual results

Team results

Medal count
The current historical medal count since 1966 is as follows:

 Note 1: Medal count is sorted by total gold medals, then total silver medals, then total bronze medals, then alphabetically.
 Note 2: Germany includes both Germany and West Germany.

External links
FEI Eventing World Championship by Ronaldo and Sharon White's Website.

Eventing
Eventing